Henrit is a surname. Notable people with the surname include:

Bob Henrit (born 1944), English drummer
James Henrit, the "Elvis" of company Elvis and Kresse

See also
Henri